Stanley Rangers (founded 1919) is an amateur rugby league club situated in the village of Stanley near Wakefield. They are in Division One of the National Conference League.
Players range from 8-years old and receive training in all aspects of the sport. Many younger players have attended Paul Sculthorpe's training camps.

Current Stanley Rangers ARLFC coaches who play(ed) professional rugby league
Iain Bowie: Wakefield Trinity, Dewsbury, Nottingham City?/Nottingham Outlaws?, Hunslet
Mark Conway: Leeds, Wakefield Trinity
Steve Durham: Hull FC, Wakefield Trinity
Jamie Field: Huddersfield, Wakefield Trinity
Ryan Hudson: Huddersfield, Wakefield Trinity, Castleford, Bradford
Gez King: Dewsbury
Gary Lord: Wakefield Trinity, Dewsbury
Ian Sampson: Bramley, Hunslet
Lee Sampson: Hunslet
Steve Abrahams: Wakefield Trinity

Former Stanley Rangers players who have turned professional

Jack Abson: Dewsbury Rams
Mark Applegarth: Wakefield Trinity Wildcats, York City Knights
Nathan Armitage: Bradford Bulls, Batley Bulldogs
Mark Aston: Sheffield Eagles (1984), Featherstone Rovers, Bramley RLFC, Sheffield Eagles, Great Britain
Danny Barnes: Halifax
John Barnes: Dewsbury Rams
James Brown: Sheffield Eagles
Steve Brown: Wakefield Trinity Wildcats
Craig Cawthray: Featherstone Rovers, Hunslet Hawks
Chris Chester: Halifax, Wigan Warriors, Hull FC, Hull Kingston Rovers
Scott Childs: Hunslet Hawks
Michael "Micky" Clarkson: Wakefield Trinity Wildcats, Featherstone Rovers
Mark Colbeck: Wakefield Trinity Wildcats
Richard Colley: Bradford Bulls, Barrow Raiders, Batley Bulldogs
Mark Conway: Leeds Rhinos, Wakefield Trinity
Ben Cooper: Sheffield Eagles, Huddersfield Giants, Leigh Centurions
Liam Crawley: Dewsbury Rams, Doncaster
Paul Crook: Oldham R.L.F.C.
Kevin Crowther: Bradford Bulls, Wakefield Trinity Wildcats, London Broncos, Warrington Wolves, Dewsbury Rams, Batley Bulldogs, 
James Davey: Wakefield Trinity Wildcats
Gareth Dobson: Castleford Tigers
Steve Durham: Hull FC, Wakefield Trinity
Kevin Eadie: Featherstone Rovers, Doncaster
Barry Eaton: Wales, Doncaster, Wakefield Trinity, Dewsbury Rams, Castleford Tigers, Widnes Vikings, Keighley Cougars, 
James Endersby: Leeds Carnegie, Leeds Rhinos, Doncaster
Gareth Firm: Hunslet Hawks
Albert 'Budgie' Firth: Wakefield Trinity, York F.C.
Matt Firth: Halifax, Keighley Cougars, Rochdale Hornets, Hunslet Hawks
David Foster: Halifax, Keighley Cougars, Hunslet Hawks
Richard Goddard: Wakefield Trinity, Castleford Tigers, York F.C., Sheffield Eagles
Stuart Godfrey: York City Knights
Chris Green: Dewsbury Rams
Simon Greenwood-Haigh: Hunslet Hawks
Chris Grice: Hunslet Hawks, Dewsbury Rams
Danny Grice: York City Knights
Josh Griffin: Wakefield Trinity Wildcats, Huddersfield Giants
Danny Grimshaw: York City Knights , Hunslet Hawks
Adie Hampshire: York City Knights
Willie Hargreaves: York F.C.
Billy Harris: Castleford Tigers
John Hirst: Wakefield Trinity Wildcats
Andy Hobson: Halifax, Widnes Vikings, Dewsbury Rams, Leigh Centurions, Blackpool Panthers
Ryan Hudson: Huddersfield Giants, Wakefield Trinity Wildcats, Castleford Tigers, Bradford Bulls
Carl Hughes: York City Knights, Featherstone Rovers, Keighley Cougars, Doncaster
Paul Hughes: Featherstone Rovers, York City Knights, Dewsbury Rams, Doncaster
Keiran Hyde: Bradford Bulls, Wakefield Trinity Wildcats
Craig Ibbotson: Hunslet Hawks
Keith Jones: Castleford Tigers
Kevin Jones: Castleford Tigers
Robin Jowitt: Dewsbury Rams, Gateshead Thunder, Featherstone Rovers, 
Warren Jowitt: Bradford Bulls, Wakefield Trinity Wildcats, Salford City Reds, Hull FC, Dewsbury Rams
Stuart Kain: Castleford Tigers, Gateshead Thunder, Hunslet Hawks, 
Billy Kershaw: Dewsbury Rams, Sheffield Eagles
Kevin King: Castleford Tigers, Wakefield Trinity Wildcats Rochdale Hornets, Batley Bulldogs
Matty King: Wakefield Trinity Wildcats
Danny Kirmond: Featherstone Rovers, Huddersfield Giants, Wakefield Trinity Wildcats
Gary Lord: Castleford Tigers, Oldham R.L.F.C., Wakefield Trinity Wildcats, Featherstone Rovers
Paul Lord: Oldham R.L.F.C., Swinton Lions, Wakefield Trinity Wildcats
Barry Lumb: Wakefield Trinity
Gordon Lynch: Doncaster
Tom Lynch: Hull FC, Featherstone Rovers
Anthony Marsh: Doncaster
Richard Marsh: Doncaster
Billy Maxwell: Dewsbury Rams
Allister McMaster: Dewsbury Rams
Adam Milner: Castleford Tigers
Laurence "Laurie" Milner: York F.C.
Dean Mountain: Castleford Tigers
Chris Molyneux: Huddersfield Giants, Sheffield Eagles, Batley Bulldogs, Featherstone Rovers
Phil Payne: Castleford Tigers
Mark Pease: Leeds Tykes
Adam Robinson: Wakefield Trinity Wildcats, Doncaster, Oldham R.L.F.C., Dewsbury Rams, Batley Bulldogs
Craig Robinson: Wakefield Trinity Wildcats, Rochdale Hornets, Oldham R.L.F.C., Doncaster
Darren Rogers: Castleford Tigers, Dewsbury Rams
Dean Sampson:  Great Britain, England, Castleford Tigers, Hunslet Hawks
Gary Shillabeer (Shillabear): Huddersfield Giants, Featherstone Rovers, Batley Bulldogs
Sean (Shawn) Snowden: Castleford Tigers
Andy Speak: Leeds Rhinos, Sheffield Eagles, Halifax, Wakefield Trinity Wildcats, Castleford Tigers, Dewsbury Rams
Rob Spicer: Wakefield Trinity Wildcats, York City Knights, Dewsbury Rams
Clayton Stott: Leeds Rhinos
Craig Taylor: Dewsbury Rams, Hunslet Hawks
Geoff Tennant: Bramley RLFC
Geoff Tomlinson: Bramley RLFC
Kyle Trout: Wakefield Trinity Wildcats
Craig Vines: Leeds Rhinos
David Wakefield: Wakefield Trinity, Doncaster
Scott Walker: Leeds Rhinos, Hunslet Hawks
Kevin Ward: Great Britain, Castleford Tigers, Manly-Warringah, St. Helens, 
John Wells: Halifax
David White: Wakefield Trinity Wildcats, Featherstone Rovers
Gareth Whitehead:  Hunslet Hawks
Taron Wildey: Wakefield Trinity Wildcats, Dewsbury Rams
Matthew Wildie: Wakefield Trinity Wildcats
Jack Wilson: York F.C.
Chris Woolford: Dewsbury Rams
Danny Wray: Dewsbury Rams
Matt Wray: Wakefield Trinity Wildcats, Featherstone Rovers, Hunslet Hawks
Nigel Wright: Wakefield Trinity Wildcats, Wigan, Huddersfield Giants,

External links
Stanley Rangers Official Website

BARLA teams
Rugby clubs established in 1919
1919 establishments in England
Rugby league teams in West Yorkshire